The Military ranks of Angola are the military insignia used by the Angolan Armed Forces.

Commissioned officer ranks
The rank insignia of commissioned officers.

Other ranks
The rank insignia of non-commissioned officers and enlisted personnel.

References

External links
 

Angola
Military of Angola